The 59045 Bandra Terminus Vapi Passenger is a Passenger train belonging to Indian Railways - Western Railway zone that runs between Bandra Terminus & Vapi in India.

It operates as train number 59045 from Bandra Terminus to Vapi serving the states of Maharashtra & Gujarat.

Coaches

The 59045 Bandra Terminus Vapi Passenger presently has 2 First Class, 2 Second Class seating, 14 General Unreserved, 2 SLR (Seating cum Luggage Rake) coaches & up to 3 High Capacity Parcel Vans. It does not carry a Pantry car coach.

As is customary with most train services in India, Coach Composition may be amended at the discretion of Indian Railways depending on demand.

Service

The 59045 Bandra Terminus Vapi Passenger covers the distance of 159 kilometres in 3 hours 50 mins (41.48 km/hr).

Routeing

The 59045 Bandra Terminus Vapi Passenger runs from Bandra Terminus via Andheri, Virar, Kelve Road, Sanjan to Vapi.

Traction

As the route is fully electrified, a Valsad Electric Loco Shed based WCAM 1 or on occasion Vadodara Electric Loco Shed based WAP 5 powers the train for its entire journey.

Rake Sharing

The train shares its rake with 59037/59038 Virar - Surat Passenger, 59039 Virar - Valsad Shuttle, 59040 Vapi - Virar Shuttle, 59046 Valsad - Bandra Terminus Passenger.

Timings

59045 Bandra Terminus Vapi Passenger leaves Bandra Terminus on a daily basis at 09:25 hrs IST and reaches Vapi at 13:15 hrs IST on the same day.

References

External links

Transport in Mumbai
Rail transport in Maharashtra
Rail transport in Gujarat
Slow and fast passenger trains in India